Celestus is a genus of diploglossid lizards mostly endemic to Jamaica (aside from a single species endemic to Haiti) and containing about 11 species, though three of these may be extinct. Formerly, this genus had more than 31 species, but a 2021 phylogenetic study found this classification to be paraphyletic and split those species into their own genera. A more recent study found that several ecomorphs exist on Jamaica including a swamp ecomorph, a tree ecomorph, and a ground ecomorph.

Species
Celestus barbouri  – Limestone Forest Lizard
Celestus crusculus  – Jamaican Forest Lizard
Celestus duquesneyi  – Blue-tailed Forest Lizard
Celestus fowleri  – Bromeliad Forest Lizard
Celestus hewardi  – Red-spotted Forest Lizard
Celestus macrolepis  (possibly extinct) Large-scaled Forest Lizard
Celestus macrotus Thomas & Hedges, 1989 – La Selle Forest Lizard
Celestus microblepharis  – Small-eyed Forest Lizard
Celestus molesworthi  Portland Coast Forest Lizard
Celestus occiduus  – Jamaican Giant Forest Lizard (possibly extinct)
Celestus striatus  (possibly extinct) Golden Forest Lizard

Nota bene: a binomial authority in parentheses indicates that the species was originally described in a genus other than Celestus.

References

Celestus
Lizard genera
Taxa named by John Edward Gray